The Islamic Saudi Academy of Washington was an International Baccalaureate (IB) World  university preparatory school in Northern Virginia, accredited with the Southern Association of Colleges and Schools and authorized by IB in December 2008. It had classes from pre-kindergarten to twelfth grade, and had a final enrollment of more than 1,200 students. It was funded by the Embassy of Saudi Arabia in Washington, DC. In 2011, ISA graduated its first international baccalaureate class. Four students received their full IB diploma and one of them was able to earn bilingual diploma. As of 2007, approximately 30% of the roughly 1,000 students were Saudi Arabian citizens. The school closed in 2016, replaced by the new King Abdullah Academy later that year.

Overview

The school was founded in 1984 by the Government of Saudi Arabia. Located in Fairfax County, Virginia, the school offered instruction from pre-kindergarten through twelve. The school was bilingual, with classes in English and Arabic.

History
The school was founded in August 1984 by a decree of King Fahd and originally served grades K–6. The Saudi government purchased the 34-acre campus of the former Fairfax Christian School in Fairfax from owner Robert L. Thoburn for $3 million as a site for the school.

The school proved so popular that by 1986 the school rented the former Dunn Loring Elementary School, which had closed in 1978, to provide space for its burgeoning student body.

Following the leasing of the Dunn Loring site, the school expanded its education program to include grades 7–12.

When the lease on the Dunn Loring site expired, the school leased the former Mount Vernon High School in Mount Vernon, Virginia, near Alexandria, spending $5 million to renovate the nearly 50-year-old building. The academy moved into the Alexandria site in 1989. For much of its history it maintained two campuses: the main campus near Alexandria and the West Campus in Fairfax Station, near Fairfax.

In December 2015 there were plans for the school to move to a new campus near Herndon.

The original ISA closed in June 2016, and the new King Abdullah Academy near Herndon opened in Fall 2016.

Programs and activities
The school's curriculum included Islamic studies, Islam for beginners, Arabic language, Arabic ASL, Mathematics, Science, Language Arts, Computers, Art, English, Social Studies, and Physical Education. The school also had an Advanced Placement Program and an English as a second language program. The school also had the IB program and offered IB English A1 + B, IB Arabic A1+B, IB Biology HL, IB Math HL + SL, IB Art, IB History HL+SL, and IB Psychology, so its students can graduate with an IB diploma.

The ISA is a member of the Northern Virginia Independent Athletic Conference (NVIAC), and participates in the basketball and soccer leagues, fielding both boys' and girls' varsity teams. The school has 3 football fields. The school was a supporter of the Mount Vernon Youth Athletic Association, an all-volunteer community program that uses athletics to teach discipline and good citizenship to area youths. They also had a Teen center for students to improve at sports.

The school participated in various educational and leadership-oriented extracurricular activities. There was an annual science fair and a Shakespearian drama program. Students were active participants in the Model United Nations program, the Presidential Classroom program, and various other programs.

Controversy
ISA has been accused of promoting religious intolerance.

On February 23, 2005, the day after Ahmed Omar Abu Ali was indicted on terrorism charges, New York Senator Charles Schumer issued a press release questioning whether the ISA was "another madrassa" (i.e. a school teaching radical Islamic theology. Madrassa is the Arabic word for school, but in English the term usually refers more narrowly to Islamic institutions of learning.)  Senator Schumer sent letters to Saudi Prince Bandar bin Sultan and U.S. Attorney General Alberto Gonzales.

In October 2007, the U.S. Commission on International Religious Freedom urged the US State Department to shut down ISA on the grounds it teaches religious intolerance.  The Commission accused the ISA of promoting religious intolerance that could prove a danger to the United States.  In response ISA officials stated that they had removed offensive passages from the books the previous summer, but did not explain why the Saudi embassy officials had refused to personally make the books available to the Commission. Officials of ISA criticized the USCIRF, saying that the panel unfairly damaged the school's reputation, and invited the commission members to review the books; an offer which was refused.  According to the Commission chair he did not take up the academy's offer of making the book available because academy officials wanted mutually acceptable scholars and translators to review the textbooks.

Textbook passages
In June 2008, another USCIRF report stated that textbooks at ISA teach students that it is permissible for Muslims to kill adulterers and converts from Islam, and also teach that, "The Jews conspired against Islam and its people." ISA officials issued a press relate stating that the aforementioned textbooks are sorely outdated, and once again invited the USCIRF to visit its campus to review more recent materials. The rejection of such an offer it stated would lead the ISA to doubt the intentions of the investigation.

Land lease
ISA's campus was leased from the Fairfax County government on a year-to-year lease, and the issue has occasionally been raised that perhaps Fairfax should not continue leasing the land if the ISA's textbooks do promote terrorism or intolerance. On June 23, 2008, Fairfax County's Board of Supervisors made a formal request to U.S. Secretary of State Condoleezza Rice to determine if Fairfax County should continue to lease the land.

Notable individuals connected to ISA
 Ahmed Omar Abu Ali, valedictorian of the academy in 1999, was convicted in 2005 on charges of providing material support to the al Qaeda terrorist network. He was sentenced to 30 years in prison. His defense team argued that his first confession in Saudi Arabia had been extracted under torture, but the judge ruled his confession admissible. Courts have upheld his conviction but pushed for a longer sentence.
 Mohammed Osman Idris and Mohammed el-Yacoubi, both former students of ISA, were denied entry to Israel in December 2001, under suspicion of planning to carry out a suicidal martyr attack. The two were departing JFK International Airport when a letter was found in el-Yacoubi's luggage which was characterized as "a farewell letter...for a suicide mission in the name of Jihad." The two hastily boarded a flight to Jerusalem, leaving behind their belongings. However, when the flight arrived in Israel, the two were detained and sent back to the U.S. Idris was later charged with lying to a federal grand jury investigating terrorism.
 Susan L. Douglass, a former social studies teacher at the school, wrote social studies textbooks for the International Institute of Islamic Thought.
 Democratic Congresswoman Abigail Spanberger taught at the school between 2002 and 2003.

See also
American schools in Saudi Arabia:
 American International School – Riyadh
 American International School of Jeddah

References

External links
 Official ISA website
 Official ISA Website  (Archive)
 ISA Mission Statement
 "Trial Starts For Student In Plot to Kill President", The New York Times
 Baltimore Sun: Repost of cited article
 Shea, Nina. "Saudi Textbooks Teach Students to Hate". The Washington Post/Newsweek (Saudi sponsorship of ISA and its textbooks)

1984 establishments in Virginia
2016 disestablishments in Virginia
Educational institutions disestablished in 2016
Educational institutions established in 1984
High schools in Fairfax County, Virginia
International schools in the United States
Islamic schools in the United States
Private K-12 schools in Virginia
Religious schools in Virginia
Saudi American
Saudi Arabia–United States relations